Burhan Akbudak (born 1 June 1995) competing in the 82 kg division of Greco-Roman wrestling. He is a member of Istanbul BB SK.

Career 
Burhan Akbudak, competing in Greco-Roman wrestling 82 kilograms category, won a gold medal in the U23 World Wrestling Championships, which was held in  Bydgoszcz, Poland .

Burhan Akbudak wins silver at 2021 World Wrestling Championships. Burhan Akbudak, who competed in the World Championship for the first time in the seniors category, faced the European champion and Olympic third runner-up, Azerbaijani Rafig Huseynov, in the final. The Azerbaijani wrestler who won the match 2-1 won the gold medal, while Burhan won the silver medal. Burhan Akbudak, beat Armenian Gegham Torgomyan by 12-0 in the first round, and defeated Hungarian Laszlo Szabo by 11-0 in the second round. Defeating the American Benjamin Provisor in the quarter-finals with a 10-0 point key, the national wrestler won the match with Iranian Pejman Soltanmorad Poshtam 5-2 in the semi-finals and made his mark in the final.

In 2022, he won the gold medal in his event at the Vehbi Emre & Hamit Kaplan Tournament held in Istanbul, Turkey. Burhan Akbudak beat Uzbekistan’s Jalgasbay Berdimuratov 7-6 in men's Greco-Roman 82 kg at the 2022 World Wrestling Championships in Belgrade, Serbia, scoring his first-ever gold in the tournament.

Major results

References

External links 
 

1995 births
Living people
Sportspeople from Kahramanmaraş
Turkish male sport wrestlers
Islamic Solidarity Games medalists in wrestling
Islamic Solidarity Games competitors for Turkey
World Wrestling Championships medalists
European Wrestling Championships medalists
20th-century Turkish people
21st-century Turkish people
World Wrestling Champions